Sean Harland Murray (born November 15, 1977) is an American actor known for his role as Special Agent Timothy McGee on the American TV drama NCIS. He also played Thackery Binx in Disney's Halloween film Hocus Pocus and Danny Walden in the military drama series JAG.

Early life 
Sean Harland Murray was born on November 15, 1977, in the Bethesda Navy Hospital in Maryland, and grew up on several military bases all over the world including Australia, Singapore, London and the United States. When he was 15, Murray's parents divorced and he and his mother moved to Los Angeles.

Murray's father is retired Navy Captain Craig Harland Murray (surface warfare) with over 30 years of service, and his Australian mother Vivienne Lee holds dual citizenship with the United States. In 1998, she married American television producer and screenwriter Donald P. Bellisario, who became Murray's stepfather. He has one brother, NCIS: Los Angeles producer Chad W. Murray, and seven stepsiblings, including Pretty Little Liars actress Troian Bellisario and JAG actor Michael Bellisario.

Career 
After Murray decided he wanted to be an actor at a young age, he worked hard to try to land small parts and when he was 11 was able to become an extra in the Steve Martin and Joan Cusack film My Blue Heaven. Murray's TV credits include a starring role in the UPN sitcom The Random Years and a supporting role as teenager Zane Grey Hart in CBS's comedy/western series Harts of the West, with Beau Bridges as his father and Harley Jane Kozak as his mother. Lloyd Bridges also starred in the series. The program was set on a dude ranch in Nevada. Murray also appeared in several episodes of JAG and was later cast as Timothy McGee in the show's spin-off, NCIS. McGee's sister is played by Troian Bellisario, his real-life stepsister. In addition, Murray has appeared in several feature films including Hocus Pocus (1993), his first motion picture film appearance, in which he played Thackery Binx. While this is one of his most well-known roles, his voice in the film was dubbed by Jason Marsden. His other film appearances include This Boy's Life; and in Todd Field's Too Romantic.

Personal life 
Murray and Carrie James, a teacher, met in 2004 at an event, and they married on November 26, 2005. They had their first child, a daughter (Caitlyn Melissa), in 2007. The couple's second child, a son (River James), was born in Los Angeles in April 2010.

Filmography

References

External links 
 
 
 Sean Murray at Twitter

1977 births
American male television actors
Living people
People from Bethesda, Maryland
Male actors from Maryland
20th-century American male actors
21st-century American male actors